Tom Milner may refer to:

Tom Milner Racing, see Brian Bonner (racing driver)
Tom Milner, singer on The Voice UK (series 5) and Waterloo Road actor
Tom Milner (rugby union), on List of Hull Kingston Rovers players

See also
Tommy Milner, American racing driver
Tommy Milner (rugby league), rugby league player